Linum campanulatum is a perennial plant belonging to the Linaceae family.

Description

Linum campanulatum  reaches on average  in height. The short stem is perennial, woody and glabrous, with long herbaceous annual branches. Leaves are alternate, up to 4 cm long and 1 cm wide. The shape of lower cauline leaves is quite variable. Usually they are obovate-obtuse, but in some cases may be spatulate-lanceolate. The upper cauline leaves are gradually reduced in width to become almost linear.

Petals are yellow, oblong-oval, 2.5-3.5 cm long. The flowering period extends from May through June. The flowers are hermaphrodite and pollinated by insects (entomophily). Fruit is a capsule with ten compartments, each containing one seed.

Distribution
This plant is widespread in the western Mediterranean, from Spain to northwestern Italy.

Habitat

References

 Conti F., Abbate G., Alessandrini A., Blasi C., 2005 - An annotated checklist of the Italian vascular flora - Palombi Editori

External links

 Biolib
 Linum campanulatum

campanulatum
Flora of Europe
Plants described in 1753
Taxa named by Carl Linnaeus